Blued is currently the largest gay social network app in the world. Launched in 2012 in China, the app now has over 40 million users worldwide  in 193 countries. The application is available on Android and iOS. Its features include verified profiles, live broadcasting, a timeline, and group conversations. In 2016, the app was valued at 600 million dollars.

History 
Ma Baoli, (also known as Geng Le), then a closeted police officer in Qinhuangdao, Hebei, set up Danlan (a reference to the Bohai Sea) a message board for gay men, in 2000. As the site gained more attention, his supervisors eventually discovered in 2012 that Ma ran the website and forced him to resign. He then came up with Blue'd, which was initially based on the American app Jack'd, and released it the same year after seeking investors.

Today, Blued employs over 200 staff at its headquarters in Beijing, China, and has recently opened new offices in London, UK, and India to overview the rapid expansion of the app overseas. Within 4 years, Blued has become the largest gay social network in the world with over 27 million registered users.

The app, the BlueCity group in general and Ma himself have been recognized for their health promotion efforts, particularly in the prevention of HIV/AIDS infections. Danlan had collaborated with health officials in Beijing to promote HIV testing to higher-risk demographics soon after its launch. After one of Ma's friends told him he was infected with HIV in 2009, BlueCity took a more comprehensive approach, eventually hosting forums with Chinese CDC and UNAIDS members, and premier Li Keqiang met with Ma in 2012 to discuss HIV/AIDS in China and discrimination against the LGBT community. This role has also been credited with giving the company more lenient treatment from the Chinese government, which has a mixed record on LGBT rights and has shut down or censored other LGBT online spaces.

In 2016, Blued partnered with Hornet, a social networking platform for gay and bisexual men. Commenting on the global partnership between Blued and Hornet, Hornet president Sean Howell declared: “Gay apps have evolved over the past few years to more fully engage users, who demand a richer, mobile experience”.

Ma announced that he would resign from BlueCity in August 2022, shortly after it was delisted form Nasdaq.

BlueCity Group 
The BlueCity group, of which Ma is CEO of, owns the following platforms:
 Blued
 Danlan Public Interest, a HIV prevention nonprofit
 He Health (a platform for men's health, including through delivery of PrEP
 LESDO, a social platform for lesbian and bisexual women that was founded in 2014 and was acquired by BlueCity in 2020; reportedly China's second-biggest dating app for lesbians
 Finka, a social media app targeted at gay and bisexual LGBTQ men with a userbase of 2.7 million as of 2019, acquired by BlueCity in 2020
 Blued Baby, a surrogacy platform for gay Chinese men looking for surrogates in other countries; ceased operations in 2021 after the Zheng Shuang surrogacy controversy

See also
 Homosocialization
 Timeline of online dating services
 Tinder

References

External links 
 
 Danlan

Android (operating system) software
IOS software
Windows Phone software
Cross-platform mobile software
Mobile social software
Male homosexuality
Same sex online dating
Online dating services of China